Yuriy Shuliatytskyi (4 August 1942 – 21 February 2013) was a Ukrainian football coach.

Personal life
He is a brother of Taras Shulyatytskyi. His son Yuriy Shulyatytskyi was also a professional footballer.

References

1942 births
2013 deaths
Sportspeople from Ivano-Frankivsk
People from the General Government
Ukrainian football managers
FC Skala Stryi (1911) managers
FC Spartak Ivano-Frankivsk managers
FC Volyn Lutsk managers